The Dummy Talks is a 1943 British crime film directed by Oswald Mitchell and starring Jack Warner, Claude Hulbert and Beryl Orde. It marked the film debut of Jack Warner.

Synopsis
Set over the course of one night, the story takes place in and around a London theatre. A series of contemporary acts are seen both performing on stage and socialising backstage. The murder of a ventriloquist takes place and two policemen, who happen to be at the theatre tracking a banknote forger, set to work finding the culprit. Ultimately, the key suspects are rounded up and a mind-reader puts on a show to reveal the killer. He's helped by a midget dressed as the dummy, hence the title.

Cast
 Jack Warner - Jack 
 Claude Hulbert - Victor Harbord 
 Beryl Orde - Beryl 
 Evelyn Darvell - Peggy
 Hy Hazell - Maya (credited as Derna Hazell)
 Manning Whiley - Russell Warren 
 Charles Carson - Marvello ("The Man With the Radio Mind")
 G. H. Mulcaster - Piers Harriman 
 John Carol - Jimmy Royce
 Gordon Edwards - Marcus
 Max Earl - Yates
 Ivy Benson and her all Ladies Band - Themselves
 Frederick Sylvester & Nephew (Eric Mudd also played the "dummy") - Themselves
 Tommy Manley & Florence Austin ("Music Hath Charms") - Themselves
 Cecil Ayres with the Skating Avalons - Themselves
 Mann & Read ("Jugglers with Fun")- Themselves
 Five Lai Founs (" Modern Chinese Wonders") - Themselves
 Jeannie White and her Stepsisters - Themselves

Critical reception
Britmovie noted "a number of genuine variety acts add a flavour of the period, although they provide rather too much of the film’s running time" ; and TV Guide called it "a weird but engaging second feature."

References

Bibliography
 Murphy, Robert. Realism and Tinsel: Cinema and Society in Britain 1939-48. Routledge, 1989.

External links

1943 films
1943 crime films
Films directed by Oswald Mitchell
British black-and-white films
British crime films
Films shot at British National Studios
1940s English-language films
1940s British films